In mid-January 2022, a bandit gang killed over 50 people in Dankade, Kebbi State, Nigeria.

Background
The Nigerian bandit conflict began in 2011, and has mostly taken place in northwestern Nigeria. Armed gangs have carried out many attacks, including mass kidnappings, robbery, arson and mass shootings. Hundreds of people have been killed and thousands displaced. The conflict escalated in the early 2020s; the largest and most deadly event being the massacres in Zamfara State in early January 2022. The Nigerian authorities, who are also opposing the Boko Haram insurgency and the insurgency in Southeastern Nigeria, have difficulty tackling the bandit gangs.

Incident
On the evening of 14 January 2022, a group of bandits attacked Dankade, a village in Kebbi State, Northwest Nigeria. After a shootout with soldiers and police in which two soldiers and a police officer were killed, security forces retreated. The gang continued their assault into the early hours of the following day, killing numerous villagers, burning down shops and grain silos, as well as stealing cattle. The gang kidnapped villagers, including its community leader. By the time the bandits left dead bodies lay all over the streets of Dankade.

A survivor recalled:“Many were killed and their corpses burnt. We can’t tell the number of fatalities right now. We are left wondering why terror killings seem to be on the rise, particularly in the North-West region.”State authorities put the casualty number at 18, while some locals said the bandits had killed over 50 civilians.

Notes

References

2022 fires in Africa
2022 mass shootings in Africa
2022 murders in Nigeria
2020s massacres in Nigeria
21st century in Kebbi State
Arson in Nigeria
Arson in the 2020s
Attacks on buildings and structures in 2022
Attacks on buildings and structures in Nigeria
Attacks on shops
Crime in Kebbi State
January 2022 crimes in Africa
January 2022 events in Nigeria
Mass shootings in Nigeria
Massacres in 2022
Nigerian bandit conflict
Terrorist incidents in Africa in 2022
Terrorist incidents in Nigeria in the 2020s
Attacks in Nigeria in 2022